Squash competitions at the 2022 South American Games in Asunción, Paraguay are scheduled to be held between October 10 and 15, 2022 at the El Centro Nacional de Squash.

Schedule
The competition schedule is as follows:

Medal summary

Medal table

Medalists

Men

Women

Mixed

Participation
Nine nations will participate in squash of the 2022 South American Games.

References

Squash
South American Games
2022